Pirivom Santhippom is a 2008 Indian Tamil-language family drama film written and directed by Karu Pazhaniappan starring Cheran and  Sneha alongside an ensemble cast. The film is about the life of a young couple in a joint family with the Nagarathar (Nattukottai Chettiar) community located in Karaikudi, Tamil Nadu. The music was composed by Vidyasagar with cinematography by M. S. Prabhu and editing by Saravanan. The film released on 14 January 2008.

Plot

Natesan (Cheran) works as an engineer in an electricity board in Karaikudi and leads a joint family with more than 30 of his relatives living in the same house. On the other hand, Visalakshi aka Sala (Sneha) is the only daughter to her parents, and she is about to complete her college education in Karaikudi. Sala feels bored while being alone and always prefers to have her friends surrounding her.

Sala's parents start searching for a groom and get a reference for Natesan. Sala and her family meet Natesan's family in a function. Sala is surprised to see so many people living as a joint family together, and she is very much impressed and agrees for the wedding. Natesan and Sala get married. Sala loves being accompanied by all the relatives in Natesan's home. When Sala and Natesan go on a honeymoon, Sala purchases gifts for everyone in the family. All the family members are also impressed upon seeing Sala.

Natesan feels sad that he does not get private time to spend with his wife as they are always surrounded by relatives. Now, he gets transferred to a hill station named Attakatti, near Pollachi. Natesan feels happy as he believes that this will provide him time to spend with Sala. Although Sala feels sad leaving all her relatives, she also goes with Natesan to the hill station.

Over there in the hill station, Sala feels lonely and gets bored, and she longs for the life that she had in Karaikudi. Their house is located in a remote place with no friends and neighbors. Natesan also gets busy with work and has very little time to spend with his wife. Slowly, Sala gets psychologically disturbed due to loneliness, and she behaves as if the house is filled with so many people. Also, she breaks the fan, lights, etc. purposefully in their home so that the nearby electrician, Karuppu (Ganja Karuppu), can come to fix them, and at least she gets a chance to speak to someone.

She also starts recording all the sounds around her such as birds chirping, etc. and listens to the recordings when alone. One day, she records a neighbour's child's laughter sound following which the child faints. Sala is scared, but the child is saved. Dr. Ramalingam (Jayaram) sees Sala and understands that she is suffering from a disorder and warns Natesan, but he does not take it seriously. One day, Sala consumes too much of sleeping pills to come out of her depression, but Natesan spots her lying in bed and rushes her to the hospital. Sala is saved. Ramalingam explains the disorder to Natesan and mentions that the best cure for her would be to lead a happy life surrounded by relatives. Natesan agrees and moves back to Karaikudi. The movie ends showing Natesan and Sala leading a happy life again.

Cast

Filming
The lead role was initially given to Jyothika, who later opted out of the project because of her pregnancy.  Kamalini Mukherjee was also cast, but she was not able to emote well and as she was alien to Tamil tradition, she was replaced by Sneha.

Release
The film was released in Pongal 2008 alongside other releases like Bheemaa, Pazhani, Kaalai, Vaazhthugal and Pidichirukku.

Reception
The film opened to highly positive reviews. Sify wrote "The film has been well crafted by Palaniappan, his story line is just an episode in a newly married girl's life but the way he has worked his screenplay around it is what makes the film click. The film is for a matured audience who will appreciate the wonderful economy of expression and deliberate silence at times and the crisp day-to-day life dialogues in the film". Rediff wrote "Pirivom Sandippom is an epic of non-eventual proportions. In other words, nothing ever happens in the movie". Behindwoods wrote "There is nothing in the movie that can be termed as a negative, that is, if you don’t mind the slow pace post-intermission, though that is inevitable, considering the storyline. Even if one could predict what is bound to happen post-interval, the director has managed to keep the tale gripping with the screenplay".

Soundtrack

The film's background score and soundtracks are composed by Vidyasagar. The album gained popularity after the film's release.

References

External links
 
 Sneha receiving her Tamil Nadu State Award for Best Actress 2008 for Pirivom Sandhippom-1
 Sneha receiving her Tamil Nadu State Award for Best Actress 2008 for Pirivom Sandhippom-2

2008 films
2000s Tamil-language films
Films scored by Vidyasagar
Films directed by Karu Pazhaniappan